Finnish rock (Finnish: suomirock or suomirokki—also known as Finnsrock, Finnrock or Finrock) refers to rock music made in Finland. The initial rock and roll boom of the 1950s was preceded by a long tradition of popular culture. Suomirock may refer to Finnish rock music in general or more narrowly rock music sung in the Finnish language.

Timeline
Finnish rock followed the common trends during the 50s and 60s. Usually Finnish rock bands performed covers or hit songs translated into Finnish. Eero Raittinen and his brother Jussi Raittinen are among the earliest rockers of the 1960s, alongside groups such as Jormas, Topmost and Ernos. The British band The Renegades found their biggest success in the 1960s Finland. Helsinki was the centre of Finnish rock and pop music during this period. Love Records was one of the first domestic record labels dedicated to Finnish rock, even though the label's roster also included jazz and political songs. Suomen Talvisota 1939-1940 represented Finnish underground, and their only album Underground-Rock (1970) is cited as a big influence among many current Finnish music-makers. Other Finnish underground/psychedelic bands of this era were The Sperm, Apollo and the ground-breaking Blues Section, which spawned Wigwam and Tasavallan Presidentti after its split.

At the beginning of the 1970s new artists emerged. Singer-songwriters such as Hector and Juice Leskinen started writing songs in Finnish, combining shades of irony, poetry and introspection with rock sound. Later in the seventies the new wave and punk brought more artists such as Pelle Miljoona, Eppu Normaali and Hassisen kone. Finnish rock had by now become independent. Names such as Dave Lindholm, Tuomari Nurmio and Ismo Alanko continued with their own styles. Tampere became at the turn of the 1970s and 80s the most vibrant town in rock culture, spawning "Manserock" as rock music by the town's artists was called.

Hurriganes, fronted by Remu Aaltonen, was one of the best-known groups in Finland. This 1970s group played hard-hitting, boogie-based simple rock, and their song "Get on" is almost anthemic in Finland. Ex-Hurriganes guitarist Albert Järvinen would later collaborate with the likes of Lemmy Kilmister of Motörhead fame, issuing the Countdown 12" single, with Lemmy featuring on lead vocals on the title track, under the name of Albert Järvinen Band. Other seminal groups were Dingo, a pop-rock group idolized by teenagers, and Yö, whose "Joutsenlaulu" remains to the day one of the most played songs in radio and karaoke. Kingston Wall was a cult band of the early 90s, combining psychedelic influences with hard rock, played by power trio and fronted by Petri Walli. J. Karjalainen has also remained popular since the early 1980s. Well-known Finnish band CMX also formed in 1985, transforming from a hardcore punk sound through progressive, metal, and hard rock sounds.

Success abroad

The earliest Finnish rock bands to gain any notoriety were progressive rock bands like Tasavallan Presidentti and Wigwam.  Though for a time they seemed poised to break through in Europe, international fame eluded them. 1980s bands were similarly unable to find an international following, such as Gringos Locos and Havana Black; one exception to this was Hanoi Rocks, a popular glam rock band. They are still the most respected Finnish group abroad. For example, in Japan there's still almost fanatic Hanoi Rocks fans. Though the band collapsed on the verge of final international breakthrough, they were the source of inspiration for glam rock bands of the 1980s including Guns N' Roses.

Some modern bands who have achieved some mainstream rock success abroad include Leningrad Cowboys, known for performing with the Red Army Choir, surf band Laika & the Cosmonauts and prog-related rock band Von Hertzen Brothers.

22-Pistepirkko has had a cult status in Europe, notably in the Netherlands and Germany. The trio's indie-rock incorporates blues and melancholy melodies, with a touch of Tom Waits.

Heavy metal

Like much of Scandinavia (or, more accurately Fennoscandia), Finland's main contribution to modern popular music may be heavy metal and related fields. Early 80s Finnish hard rock and heavy metal bands of note include Riff Raff, Oz, and Zero Nine while Stratovarius and thrashers Stone would first emerge in the late 80s.  Since then the Finnish scene has given rise to bands like Children of Bodom, Amorphis, Nightwish, Apocalyptica, Impaled Nazarene, Beherit, Archgoat, Waltari, Entwine, The 69 Eyes, Sinergy, Sentenced, Sonata Arctica, Am I Blood, Ensiferum, Turisas, Moonsorrow, Korpiklaani, Finntroll, Wintersun, Battlelore, Machine Men, Mannhai, To/Die/For, Turisas, Battle Beast, Beast in Black and Teräsbetoni.

A popular Finnish band abroad is HIM whose music has been labeled "love metal". HIM and The Rasmus topped album charts in several European countries with their most popular albums. HIM got also a gold record in the USA in 2006. The international success of HIM and The Rasmus during the current decade is wider than any Finnish group has gotten before.

Finland were also the winners of the 2006 Eurovision Song Contest, with the first heavy metal band to enter the competition, Lordi. Lordi won with their Hard Rock Hallelujah composition, sporting elaborate costumes. Since then, they have found success across Europe and limited publicity outside of the continent. Lordi have also competed in Kuorosota, the Finnish version of Clash of the Choirs.

Throughout the Finland and Scandinavian countries there has been an uprising of 80s era "glam metal" bands heavily influenced by bands like Mötley Crüe and Guns N' Roses with a modern twist like Reckless Love, Santa Cruz, Crashdïet and Hardcore Superstar.

Extreme metal
Finland, like its Scandinavian neighbors, also has a vibrant extreme metal scene, which while propagating a more underground and slightly less accessible sound is still notably not only internationally successful but also on a few occasions giving the more mainstream heavy metal bands competition in the nation's awards ceremonies. The most famous Finnish bands in extreme metal are most probably Amorphis, Children of Bodom, Beherit, Archgoat, Impaled Nazarene, and the grindcore band Rotten Sound, which recently signed to the renowned American label Relapse Records.

The extreme metal scene in Finland is highly dominated by death metal of various subgenres ranging from melodic death metal such as Omnium Gatherum to more old school traditional death metal bands like Demilich and Convulse, the second of whose first album has been thrice reissued by the aforementioned Relapse Records—most recently in 2013—as well as by Finland’s own Svart Records in both 2018 and 2019.

Finnish rock & heavy metal artists and bands

 The 69 Eyes
 Ajattara
 Aknestik
 Altaria
 Am I Blood
 Amberian Dawn
 Amorphis
 Andy McCoy
 Apocalyptica
 Appendix
 Apulanta
 Archgoat
 Los Bastardos Finlandeses
 Battle Beast
 Battlelore
 Beherit
 Blind Channel
 Bloodpit
 Blues Section
 Before the Dawn
 Callisto
 Carmen Gray
 Catamenia
 Celesty
 Charon
 Children of Bodom
 Convulse (band)
 CMX
 Damn Seagulls
 Dark Sarah
 Deep Insight
 Demilich
 Dingo
 Disco Ensemble
 Don Huonot
 Dreamtale
 End of You
 Ensiferum
 Entwine
 Eppu Normaali
 Eternal Tears of Sorrow
 Excalion
 Falchion
 Feiled
 Finntroll
 Flat Earth
 Flinch
 The Flaming Sideburns
 Goatmoon
 Ben Granfelt
 Haloo Helsinki!
 Hanoi Rocks
 Hanna Pakarinen
 Happoradio
 Hassisen kone
 Hector
 Hevisaurus
 Hidria Spacefolk
 HIM
 Hurriganes
 Impaled Nazarene
 Indica
 Insomnium
 Jeavestone
 Kaaos
 Kalmah
 Kemopetrol
 Kingston Wall
 Kiuas
 Klamydia
 Korpiklaani
 Kotiteollisuus
 KYPCK
 Leevi and the Leavings
 Lordi
 Lost Society
 Lovex
 Lullacry
 Lyijykomppania
 The Jade
 Juice Leskinen
 Maj Karma
 Manna
 Michael Monroe
 Miljoonasade
 Mokoma
 Moonsorrow
 Mors Principium Est
 Pate Mustajärvi
 Negative
 Neljä Ruusua
 Nightwish
 Norther
 Passionworks
 Peer Günt
 Pelle Miljoona
 Penniless
 PMMP
 Poets of the Fall
 Poisonblack
 Popeda
 Private Line
 The Rasmus
 Rauli Badding Somerjoki
 Reckless Love
 Ruoska
 Rytmihäiriö
 Santa Cruz (band)
 Sentenced
 Shade Empire
 Shaman
 ShamRain
 Sielun Veljet
 Sinamore
 Sinergy
 SomBy
 Sonata Arctica
 Sotajumala
 Stam1na
 Stalingrad Cowgirls
 Stella
 Stone
 Stratovarius
 Sturm Und Drang
 Sunrise Avenue
 Swallow The Sun
 Tabula Rasa
 Tarja
 Tarot
 Tasavallan Presidentti
 Tehosekoitin
 Terveet Kädet
 Teräsbetoni
 Thunderstone
 Timo Rautiainen & Trio Niskalaukaus
 To/Die/For
 Tuomari Nurmio
 Turisas
 Turmion Kätilöt
 Uniklubi
 Velcra
 Verjnuarmu
 Viikate
 Villieläin
 Von Hertzen Brothers
 Maija Vilkkumaa
 YUP
 Yö
 Waltari
 Wasara
 Wigwam
 Widescreen Mode
 Wiidakko
 Jann Wilde
 Winterborn
 Wintersun
 Zen Café
 Zook

See also
Suomisaundi
Music of Finland

References

Further reading
 Jee jee jee. Suomalaisen rokin historia (Bruun, Seppo - Lindfors, Jukka - Luoto, Santtu - Salo, Markku)
 Yeah Yeah Yeah. History of Finnish Rock. WSOY 2002
 Suomi-rockin tiekartta (Petri Nevalainen)
 The Roadmap of Finnish rock (Ajatuskirjat 2005)
 Rockin korkeat korot: Suomalaisen naisrockin historia! (Arja Aho - Anne Taskinen)
 High heels of rock: The history of Finnish girlrock! (WSOY 2004)

External links
 Suomirocks.com
 Finnish Rock
 Kaamos - Finnish rock and metal webzine
 Imperiumi - Finnish metal webzine 
 50 Alltime greatest Finnish albums—a selection of Finnish popular music albums by professional critics, contains almost exclusively Finnish rock

Finnish music
Music scenes
Finland